Akap Sinem (born ) is a retired Turkish female volleyball player.

She was part of the Turkey women's national volleyball team. 
She participated at the 2003 Women's European Volleyball Championship, and the 2008 FIVB Volleyball World Grand Prix.
On club level she played for Eczacibasi, TUR in 2003.

References

External links
 Profile at FIVB.org
http://www.voleybolunsesi.com/content.php?&cid=14&id=3475&lang=en

1982 births
Living people
Turkish women's volleyball players
Place of birth missing (living people)